The Women's 100 Breaststroke event at the 11th FINA World Aquatics Championships swam 25+26 July 2005 in Montreal, Canada. Preliminary and semifinal heats were swum on 25 July, with the prelims in the morning session and the semis in the evening. The final went the next evening.

At the start of the event, the existing world (WR) and championship (CR) records were:
WR: 1:06.37, Leisel Jones (Australia) swum 21 July 2003 in Barcelona, Spain
CR: 1:06.37, Leisel Jones (Australia) swum 21 July 2003 in Barcelona, Spain

Results

Prelims

Semifinals

Final

References

Swimming at the 2005 World Aquatics Championships
2005 in women's swimming